The Brunswick Line is a MARC commuter rail line between Washington, D.C., and Martinsburg, West Virginia, with a branch to Frederick, Maryland. It primarily serves the northern and western suburbs of Washington. The line, MARC's second longest at 74 miles, is operated under contract to MARC by Alstom and runs on CSX-owned track, including the Metropolitan, Old Main Line, and Cumberland Subdivisions. It is the successor to commuter services provided by the Baltimore & Ohio Railroad (B&O), which date to the mid-19th century.

History
Prior to MARC, the B&O operated commuter trains between Washington and Martinsburg, which continued even after the start of Amtrak on May 1, 1971. Maryland began subsidizing the trains in 1974 and, in 1975, assumed full responsibility for the subsidy and equipment replacement. West Virginia followed suit soon after, guaranteeing service to its stations.

In 1983, Marylandalong with a number of other Northeastern statestook control of its commuter railroads, organizing them under the "MARC" (Maryland Area Regional Commuter) service name.  Trains on the Brunswick Line were operated under contract by CSX Transportation, successor to the B&O. Brunswick Line service was augmented in 1986 when Amtrak transferred its Washington–Martinsburg Blue Ridge to MARC after agreeing to subsidize the train for five years.

In May 2010, MARC announced that it planned to find a new operator for the Brunswick and Camden Lines after CSX announced its desire to discontinue operation of commuter trains. MARC selected Bombardier Transportation Services USA Corporation (BTS) (a subsidiary of the Canadian company Bombardier Transportation) to replace CSX, and BTS assumed operations and maintenance of the lines on June 29, 2013. CSX continues to dispatch the lines.

Rolling stock

Brunswick Line trains typically have 4–6 single or bilevel passenger cars and one or two diesel locomotives. The trains operate in a push-pull configuration, with the cab car typically facing Washington.

Prior to being replaced by new Bombardier Multilevel II cars, MARC's ex-Metra Pullman Gallery cars were used exclusively on the Brunswick Line, which is the only MARC line with all low-level platforms (except the Frederick Branch, which has a high level platform at Monocacy station).

Service
The Brunswick Line has service only on weekdays, with 9 trains in each direction during morning and evening rush hour, and an additional train outbound from Union Station on Fridays. Three of the 9 trains in each direction serve the Frederick branch. Of the remainder, 3 inbound and 3 outbound serve Martinsburg, while the remainder originate or terminate at Brunswick. A bus runs between Frederick and Point of Rocks, meeting trains that do not serve the Frederick Branch.

Connections to the Washington Metro's Red Line are available at Rockville, and Union Station.

Stations
The Brunswick Line serves the following stations. Not all trains stop at all stations.

References 

 
Martinsburg, West Virginia
MARC Train
Maryland railroads
Passenger rail transportation in Maryland
Passenger rail transportation in Washington, D.C.
Passenger rail transportation in West Virginia
Washington, D.C., railroads
West Virginia railroads